The List of shipwrecks in 1750 includes some ships sunk, wrecked or otherwise lost during 1750.

March
1750 did not begin on 1 January!

27 March

April

22 April

Unknown date

May

Unknown date

June

15 June

July

21 July

August

15 August

18 August

Unknown date

September

2 September

5 September

Unknown date

October

30 October

Unknown date

November

26 November

30 November

Unknown date

December

4 December

28 December

January

4 January

10 January

14 January

17 January

18 January

23 January

Unknown date

February

2 February

12 February

Unknown date

March

4 March

16 March

23 March

Unknown date

Unknown date

Notes
 Until 1752, the year began on Lady Day (25 March) Thus 24 March 1749 was followed by 25 March 1750. 31 December 1750 was followed by 1 January 1750.
 Issue is misdated 1750

References

1750